Henry O. Jaastad (1872–1965) was an influential Tucson, Arizona architect.  His firm created over 500 buildings and Jaastad was Mayor of Tucson for 14 years.  A number of his works are listed on the U.S. National Register of Historic Places for their architecture.

Personal information
Jaastad was born in Norway in 1872.  In 1886 – at age 14 – he emigrated to the United States. In 1902, as a skilled journeyman carpenter, he worked on the Willard Hotel, Owl's Club, and Desert Botanical laboratories in Tucson, Arizona. In that same year, Jaastad was able to start his own contractor business where he would design small but remarkable residential buildings for private individuals. He worked in neighborhoods within Armory Park, West University, and North Speedway.  In 1904, two years later, Jaastad became a naturalized citizen of the US. In 1908, he completed extensive courses in architecture and he enrolled in the University of Arizona where he was a part of an electrical engineering program. In 1922, Jaastad officially became a registered architect, and held his architecture license until 1959.

Works
Works include (with attribution, which varies):

Extant buildings
 Patagonia City Hall (1900), Patagonia, Arizona.
 Diego Valencia House (1907), 432-43 South Convent Avenue, Barrio Viejo, Tucson.
 Reilly Funeral Home (1908), 102 East Pennington Street, Tucson.
 Brick Row House (1909), 440-446 South Convent Avenue, Barrio Viejo, Tucson.
 Old Nogales City Hall and Fire Station (1914), 136 Grand Ave and/or 223 Grand Ave. Nogales (Jaastad,Henry O.), NRHP-listed
 Odd Fellows Hall (1914), 135 South 6th Avenue, Armory Park, Tucson. (credited to Jaastad, but more likely designed by Ely Blount while working in Jaastad's office)
 Manning-Johnson House (1916), 455 West Paseo Redondo, El Presidio, Tucson. (Image) Owned many years by Emery and Ann-Eve Johnson and now occupied by a law firm which has removed most of the residence's noted original grandeur and historical interior and exterior features.
 Safford Middle School (1918), 200 East 13th Street, Armory Park, Tucson.
 Paul Lawrence Dunbar 1-9 School (1918), 325 West 2nd Street, Dunbar Spring, Tucson.
 Commercial Building (1918), 41-47 South 6th Avenue.
 Arizona Bank and Trust (1920), 429 Main Safford, Arizona (Jaastad, H.O.), NRHP-listed
 Tucson Medical Center Buildings (1926–27): Erickson House, Arizona Patio Building, Education Building (to be demolished), 4 Court Buildings (to be demolished).
 Casa Grande Woman's Club Building (1924), NRHP-listed
 Tucson High School and Vocational Educational Building (1924), Lyman & Place/Henry Haastad, Associate.
 Saint Augustine Cathedral (façade remodel 1929)
 Grace Lutheran Church (1949)
 Arizona Hotel, 31-47 N. Sixth Ave., 135 E. Tenth St. Tucson, (Jaastad, Henry O.), NRHP-listed
 Copper Bell Bed and Breakfast, 25 N. Westmoreland Ave. Tucson, AZ (Jaastad, Henrik Olsen), NRHP-listed
 Our Lady of the Blessed Sacrament Church, 914 Sullivan St. Miami, AZ (Jaastad, Henry O.), NRHP-listed
 Safford High School, 520 Eleventh St. Safford, Arizona (Jaastad, H.O.), NRHP-listed
 University Heights Elementary School, 1201 N. Park Ave. Tucson, AZ (Jaastad, Henry Olson), NRHP-listed

Demolished buildings
 University Methodist Episcopal Church (1924) Demolished 1987
 El Conquistador Hotel (1928)
 Safford High School (original) 1915 Demolished mid 1990s
 Buena Vista Hotel (1928), 322 Main Safford, Arizona (Jaastad, H.O.), demolished by 2015, NRHP-listed

References

Sources
 Nequette, Anne M. and Jeffery, R. Brooks. A Guide to Tucson Architecture.  University of Arizona Press 2002.
 Regan, Margaret. "Remembering Rockfellow: Although Her Name is all but Forgotten, Tucson's First Female Architect Left Her Mark". Tucson Weekly Jan. 31, 2000.
 Regan, Margaret. "Class Struggle", Tucson Weekly. December 2, 1999.

External links
 

Artists from Tucson, Arizona
Mayors of Tucson, Arizona
American people of Norwegian descent
Architects from Arizona
1872 births
1965 deaths
Architects from Tucson, Arizona